Vivian Township may refer to:

Canada

Vivian Township, Thunder Bay District, Ontario

United States

 Vivian Township, Waseca County, Minnesota
 Vivian Township, Sargent County, North Dakota, a township in North Dakota
 Vivian Township, Lyman County, South Dakota, a township in South Dakota

See also 
 Vivian (disambiguation)

Township name disambiguation pages